Těšetice is a municipality and village in Olomouc District in the Olomouc Region of the Czech Republic. It has about 1,300 inhabitants.

Administrative parts
Villages of Rataje and Vojnice are administrative parts of Těšetice.

References

Villages in Olomouc District